The Amectran Exar-1 was an electric sports car prototype developed by Edmond X. Ramirez, Sr. in 1979. The prototype was built by the Italian Designer Pietro Frua. The car was advertised by Amectran to be the "world's first production, electronic powered automobile". The car was highly praised before the prototype was finished by the United States Secretary of Transportation.

References

Cars of the United States
Electric car models